Herimosa is a genus of skipper butterflies in the family Hesperiidae.

Species
Herimosa albovenata Waterhouse, 1940

References
Natural History Museum Lepidoptera genus database
Herimosa at funet

Hesperiidae genera
Trapezitinae